Citharoides is a genus of citharid flounders native to the Indian and West Pacific Oceans.

Species
The currently recognized species in this genus are:
 Citharoides macrolepidotus C. L. Hubbs, 1915 (branched-ray flounder)
 Citharoides macrolepis (Gilchrist, 1904) (twospot largescale flounder)
 Citharoides orbitalis Hoshino, 2000

References

Pleuronectiformes